Brooke Army Medical Center (BAMC) is the United States Army's premier medical institution. Located on Fort Sam Houston, BAMC, a 425-bed Academic Medical Center, is the Department of Defense's largest facility and only Level 1 Trauma Center. BAMC is also home to the Center for the Intrepid, an outpatient rehabilitation facility. The center is composed of ten separate organizations, including community medical clinics, centered around the Army's largest in-patient hospital. BAMC is staffed by more than 8,000 Soldiers, Airmen, Sailors, Civilians, and Contractors providing care to wounded Service Members and the San Antonio Community at-large.

History

Station Hospital

Brooke Army Medical Center has a history which dates back to 1879 when the first Post Hospital opened as a small medical dispensary located in a single-story wooden building. In 1886, the first permanent hospital was built. In 1908, an 84-bed Station Hospital was constructed on the west side of the post.

In 1929, Brigadier General Roger Brooke assumed command of the Station Hospital, a position he held until 1933. Brooke is credited with instituting the first routine chest X-ray in military medicine. In July 1936, the cornerstone was laid for the construction of a replacement Station Hospital. By November 1937, the new 418-bed hospital was operational, having cost $3 million. The new hospital was the first in a series of moves which changed Fort Sam Houston from an Infantry to a medical Post.

In 1941, the Station Hospital prepared for an overwhelming flow of casualties from World War II battlefields by converting a 220-person enlisted barracks into additional patient wards.

Brooke General Hospital
In 1942, the Station Hospital was renamed Brooke General Hospital in Brooke's honor. In 1944, BAMC converted a Cavalry Battalion barracks into a convalescent unit to accommodate the flow of casualties from the war. This building later became Beach Pavilion. Beach housed a substantial portion of BAMC assets to include patient wards and specialty clinics.

Brooke Army Medical Center
In 1946, Fort Sam Houston was chosen as the new site for the U.S. Army Medical Field Service School. The decision to centralize the Army's medical research and training at one location resulted in the renaming of Brooke General Hospital to Brooke Army Medical Center. In September 1987, the official groundbreaking took place for the construction of a new hospital.

On July 18, 1995, ownership of the replacement hospital was given to the BAMC Commander by the U.S. Army Corps of Engineers during the key turnover ceremony. On March 14, 1996, the new facility was officially dedicated and on April 13, BAMC opened for business with the transfer of inpatients from the "old" BAMC to the "new" BAMC.

Today "old" BAMC is home to United States Army South and a number of smaller units.

SAMMC
Because of the 2005 Base realignment and closure, Brooke Army Medical Center's inpatient absorbed those of the Air Force's Wilford Hall (Wilford Hall no longer provides inpatient care) creating San Antonio Military Medical Center (SAMMC) on September 6, 2011. As of 1 Oct 2017, the designation SAMMC was removed and BAMC continues to represent the headquarters that serves as the command for the entire hospital along with the medical clinics on Fort Sam Houston, others in the San Antonio area, and one at the Army Depot in Corpus Christi. The collaboration between BAMC and local Air Force Medical assets are governed by the San Antonio Military Health System (SAMHS).

Timeline
 1870 to 1875 - City of San Antonio donates  for an Army post
 1879 - temporary wooden (board and batten, not log) 12-bed hospital built
 1886 - permanent, brick 12-bed hospital built to replace the temporary one
 1908 - Station Hospital built to accommodate 84 beds
 1910 - two wings added to Station Hospital, increasing its capacity by 68 beds
 1912 - an isolation ward and a maternity ward added to Station Hospital
 1936 - construction begins on new Station Hospital building, on the site of the old Camp Travis Base Hospital
 1938 - new Station Hospital opens with a 418-bed capacity
 1941 to 1945 - Station Hospital expands by converting barracks to hospital wards
 1942 - Station Hospital named Brooke General Hospital
 1942 - psychiatric ward built in Old Station Hospital area
 1945 - 15th Field Artillery Barracks become Annex IV, increasing capacity to 7,800 beds
 1946 - the Medical Field Service School (MFSS) is moved to Fort Sam Houston. The medical entities are reorganized and designated Brooke Army Medical Center (BAMC)
 1959 - Annex IV is designated Beach Pavilion
 1959 - psychiatric ward is designated Chambers Pavilion
 1975 - added to the National Register of Historic Places as a contributing property of the Fort Sam Houston Historic District
 1983 - design authority issued for a facility to replace BAMC's 59 separate buildings
 1985 - concept design started for the new BAMC
 1992 - construction of new BAMC starts
 1996 - new BAMC opens
 2001 - added individually to the National Register of Historic Places
 2005 - BRAC 2005 recommends (172 Med 10) the realignment of inpatient services and related specialty care from Wilford Hall Medical Center (WHMC) to Brooke Army Medical Center (BAMC), creating the San Antonio Military Medical Center (SAMMC)
 2009 - BRAC construction begins
 2011 - Parking Garage opened
 2012 - Consolidated Tower (CoTo) wing opened
 2015 - The new dining hall opens

SAMMC

San Antonio Military Medical Center (SAMMC) — the inpatient capabilities at Brooke Army Medical Center (BAMC)— is situated at Fort Sam Houston, San Antonio, Texas, and is part of the U.S. Army Medical Command (MEDCOM). BAMC is the command element over all Army medical facilities in the San Antonio area, including SAMMC (SAMMC is no longer the term used; BAMC is the name of the hospital and is responsible for the administrative and clinical oversight of the Army healthcare facilities in San Antonio). The term SAMMC solely applies to the inpatient capabilities within the hospital at Brooke Army Medical Center (BAMC). The hospital as a whole as well as the outlying clinics are considered BAMC. It is a University of Texas Health Science Center at San Antonio and USUHS teaching hospital and is home to the U.S. Army Institute of Surgical Research Burn Center. The USAISR Burn Center is part of the U.S. Army Medical Research and Development Command located at Fort Detrick, Maryland.

The hospital today is a 425-bed Joint Commission-accredited facility, expandable to 653 beds in the event of disaster. Services include general medical and surgical care, adult and pediatric primary care clinics, 24-hour Emergency department, specialty clinics, clinical services, wellness and prevention services, veterinary care, and environmental health services.

BAMC is the only MEDCOM Level I trauma center in the Department of Defense, and is part of the Regional Health Command Central (RHC-C).

The old BGH building (1937) was added to the National Register of Historic Places on November 30, 2001.

SAMMC (BAMC) concept

Under BRAC 2005, BAMC will expand its inpatient services as those services are relocated from the 59th Medical Wing, Wilford Hall Medical Center (USAF). The Nuclear Medicine service is one of the first to completely integrate operations, and offers PET/CT, SPECT/CT, and other molecular imaging and therapy services.

To accomplish the realignment of inpatient services and related specialty care from Wilford Hall Medical Center (WHMC) to Brooke Army Medical Center (BAMC) as presented in the BRAC 2005 scenario, BAMC will undergo the construction of a consolidated tower, a parking facility, a central energy plant, and renovations within the existing facility.

Consolidated Tower (CoTo)
Construction began in March 2009 on the nearly  project. CoTo was added on the east side of the facility adjacent to the clinical building and medical mall. This addition houses administrative space, an outpatient pediatrics clinic, an expanded Emergency and Trauma department, a SICU, a CCU, a psychiatric unit, and an expansion of the USAISR Burn Center which has 16 Burn Intensive Care Unit beds and 24 Progressive Care beds. SAMMC will serve as a health science center for inpatient and ambulatory care, consisting of training for Graduate Medical Education (GME), a Level 1 Trauma Center. The USAISR Burn Center is the only American Burn Association verified Burn Center within the DoD.

Parking garage
Construction began in March 2009 on a multi-level, 5,000-space parking structure to accommodate the increased capacity at the upgraded medical facility.

Central energy plant
Due to the size increase in the BAMC facility, additional heating and cooling capacities are being provided with a  central energy plant, which is under construction.

References

"Hospitals At Fort Sam Houston" Fort Sam Houston Museum, 2006, a public domain work of the United States Government.

External links

 San Antonio Military Medical Center
 Brook Army Medical Center
 Medical Therapy of Prostatic Symptoms page about Brooke Army Medical Center - SAMMC-North
 

Buildings of the United States government in Texas
United States Army medical installations
Hospital buildings completed in 1886
Hospital buildings completed in 1907
Hospital buildings completed in 1937
Military hospitals in the United States
Buildings and structures in San Antonio
National Register of Historic Places in San Antonio
Joint Base San Antonio
Healthcare in San Antonio
Military facilities in Texas
Hospitals in Texas
Teaching hospitals in Texas
University of Texas System
Hospital buildings on the National Register of Historic Places in Texas
Individually listed contributing properties to historic districts on the National Register in Texas
Trauma centers
Public hospitals in the United States